Ringle is a surname. Notable people with the surname include:

Bartholomew Ringle (1814–1881), American politician
Christian M. Ringle, professor of management
John Ringle (1848-1923), American businessman and politician 
Oscar Ringle (1878-1945), American politician and lawyer